Alban Arena (formerly known as St Albans City Hall or Civic Hall) is a theatre and music venue located in St Albans, England.

The venue opened in 1968 with a performance by blues singer John Mayall, and has staged concerts by bands such as Dire Straits in 1978 and Jethro Tull in 2010. Mayall returned to celebrate 40th anniversary in 2008.

Soon after opening in 1968 the City Hall began hosting regular "Civic Discos", on Mondays for teenagers and on Saturday nights (with occasional live music) for older patrons. The Monday night Disc Jockeys included the London impresario "Rocky Rivers" and Jeff Spencer, later DJs included Graham Kentsley who hosted a series of events celebrating 50 years of the Civic Disco in aid of the New St Albans Museum that opened in 2018.

Over the Christmas period of 2004, the pantomime Aladdin was staged at the venue with participation Michelle Bass, the December 2005 show was Peter Pan with Leslie Grantham and Dani Harmer, and in 2009 The Little Mermaid with Sarah-Jane Honeywell.

In 2007 the St Albans International Organ Festival took place at the arena.

Notes

References

External links
 

Buildings and structures in St Albans
Theatres in Hertfordshire
Music venues in Hertfordshire